The 2016 Milex Open was a professional tennis tournament played on green clay courts. It was the second edition of the tournament which was part of the 2016 ATP Challenger Tour. It took place in Santo Domingo, Dominican Republic between 8 February and 14 February 2016.

Singles main draw entrants

Seeds

 1 Rankings were as of February 1, 2016.

Other entrants
The following players received wildcards into the singles main draw:
  Emilio Gómez
  Nick Hardt
  Nicolás Jarry
  José Olivares

The following players received entry into the singles main draw as alternates:
  Franko Škugor
  João Souza

The following players received entry from the qualifying draw:
  Pere Riba
  Darian King
  Gonzalo Lama
  Roberto Quiroz

Champions

Singles

 Guido Andreozzi def.  Nicolás Kicker, 6–0, 6–4

Doubles

 Ariel Behar /  Giovanni Lapentti def.  Jonathan Eysseric /  Franko Škugor, 7–5, 6–4

References

External links
 Milex Open at La Bocha
 ATP Challenger Tour

Milex Open
Santo Domingo Open (tennis)